Wallace Wright (born 1984) is an American football player.

Wallace Wright may also refer to:

 Wallace Wright (footballer) (1912–??), Scottish footballer
 Wallace Duffield Wright (1875–1953), British soldier